Senator Ziegler may refer to:

Bob Ziegler (1921–1991), Alaska State Senate
Donald N. Ziegler (born 1949), Minnesota State Senate
Hal Ziegler (1932–2012), Michigan State Senate